IFK Skövde is a Swedish sports club located in Skövde, with the following sections:

 IFK Skövde HK – handball section.
 IFK Skövde FK - football section.